Blue Mountains: A Modern Day Classic is a 2015 Bollywood drama film, written and directed by Suman Ganguli, & produced by Raujesh Kumar Jain. The film stars Ranvir Shorey, Gracy Singh, Rajpal Yadav, Simran Sharma, Arif Zakaria, Mahesh Thakur, Yatharth Ratnum.

The movie released in India on 7 April 2017.

Plot
Som, a hill-town boy, accidentally selected in a singing reality TV show. Som’s mother, a celebrity singer of yesteryear, starts dreaming of materializing her unfulfilled dreams through her son, Som is pushed into the vortex of 'making of a celebrity singer', by everyone, from the sleepy hamlet. But Som's conquest for stardom ends faster than it had begun. He returns to his hometown unceremoniously. Once a dreamer of the Blue Mountains, Som sinks in the abyss of lowest self-esteem. Som's parents, close friends, his school teachers and well wishers take up the Herculean task of retrieving the titanic of Som's morale. But clutching the lineage of music, he comes out victorious, returning to the old prototype of the hill town brat, scaling the highs of his blue mountains once again. Blue Mountains is for those who have not made it to the final of any 'talent hunt contest' - called life.

Awards
The film won the awards at the 2015 Golden Elephant trophy : Best Feature Film
Blue Mountains movie won the awards at the 2016 Nashik Film Festival trophy : Best Director and Best Director of photography
The film won the awards at the 2016 Hyderabad Film Festival: Best Feature Film

Summary of Awards 
Winner: Best Feature Film at the 19th International Children’s Film Festival
Winner: Special Festival Mention at the 4th Indian Cine Film Festival
Winner: Special Jury Award at the 2nd International Film Festival Shimla
Winner: Best Director at the 8th Nashik International Film Festival
Winner: Best Cinematography at the 8th Nashik International Film Festival
Winner: Best Children’s Film at the 1st Haryana International Film Festival
Winner: Best Supporting Actor at the 1st Haryana International Film Festival
Winner: Best Editor at the 1st Haryana International Film Festival

Cast
Ranvir Shorey as Om Mehra
Gracy Singh as Vaani Mehra
Rajpal Yadav as Damodar
Simran Sharma as Oshin
Arif Zakaria as Mr. Mathews
Mahesh Thakur as Prakash
 Yatharth Ratnum as Som Mehra
Sanjeev Rathore
 Vaibhav Hanshu as Akks
 Lisa-Marie Rettenbacher as Hansini
 Lamira Faro as Mother of Hansini
 Rishabh Sharma as Humpty
Mehul Kapadia
 Raujesh Kumar Jain Special Appearance

Music
" Bheeni Bheeni Bhor" - Sadhana Sargam, Suraj Jagan, Yatharth Ratnum
"Get Set Go" - Shaan
"Kaare Kaare Badra" - Shreya Ghoshal
"Shanno" - Sunidhi Chauhan
"Vote Do" - Kailash Kher

References

2015 films
2010s Hindi-language films